Vilde Nilsen (born 12 January 2001) is a Norwegian Paralympic cross-country skier and biathlete.

Career
She made her Paralympic debut during the 2018 Winter Paralympics at the age of 17. Vilde Nilsen claimed a silver medal in the women's 1.5km sprint classic standing cross-country skiing event as a part of the 2018 Winter Paralympics, which is also her first Paralympic medal.

She won the gold medal in the women's 10km standing cross-country skiing event at the 2021 World Para Snow Sports Championships held in Lillehammer, Norway. She also won the silver medal in the women's long-distance standing cross-country skiing event.

References

External links 
 

2001 births
Living people
Norwegian female biathletes
Norwegian female cross-country skiers
Paralympic biathletes of Norway
Paralympic cross-country skiers of Norway
Paralympic silver medalists for Norway
Paralympic bronze medalists for Norway
Cross-country skiers at the 2018 Winter Paralympics
Cross-country skiers at the 2022 Winter Paralympics
Biathletes at the 2018 Winter Paralympics
Medalists at the 2018 Winter Paralympics
Medalists at the 2022 Winter Paralympics
Sportspeople from Tromsø
Paralympic medalists in cross-country skiing
21st-century Norwegian women